Billabong Pro Teahupoo is a professional surfing competition of the World Surf League held at the break Teahupo'o in Taiarapu, Tahiti. The Billabong Pro Teahupoo was founded in 1999 and has been recognized as "one of the world's heaviest big wave competitions". This is because Teahupoo is the only known natural wave break in the world that breaks below sea level. It is also "renowned for being the deadliest competition associated with surfing to this present date". The Billabong Pro Teahupoo has not claimed any lives since the surf competition began in 1999, but the wave has claimed lives over the years.

Billabong Pro Teahupoo location 

The surfing event takes place in Teahupo’o, a village on the south-west coast of the island of Tahiti, French Polynesia, southern Pacific Ocean. Teahupo'o is a reef break. The swells that hit the reef mainly break left, but the outer reef also creates right breaks that surfers must be cautious of when paddling out. Therefore, Teahupo'o is also "renowned for the consistent number of barrels it delivers". However, "only experienced surfers in peak physical condition should attempt Teahupo'o". The breaks heavy waves combined with a shallow shoreline can result in serious injuries and even death in a wipeout.

Billabong Pro Teahupoo wave break 

The Billabong Pro Teahupo'o's reputation for wave riding is due partly to its unique form. An extremely shallow coral reef which ranges up to 20 inches beneath the waters surface is responsible for a very hollow-breaking wave. The wave's unique shape, with an effect of almost breaking below sea level, is due to the specific shape of the reef beneath the wave. Its semi circular nature which drops down sharply creates a 'below water' effect and the extreme angles in descent create an instant instability to the wave. A steep wall of reef causes the entire mass to fold onto a scalloped semi circle breaking arc. The wave bends and races along into a dry reef closeout and the lip of the wave is often as thick as it is tall. Combined, these unique properties have earned Teahupo’o distinction as  “one of the deadliest big wave competitions in the world to this present date."

Billabong Pro Teahupoo competition 

The ASP Billabong Pro Teahupo’o consists of four parts based an elimination process. The first is composed of the competitive heats. The second is composed of the Quarter Finals. The third is composed of the Semi Finals. The fourth and last part of the competition is the Finals. Once this process of the Billabong Pro Teahupoo competition is completed, then a Billabong Pro Teahupoo Champion is named.

Naming
Since the birth of this competition it had different names.

Winners 
The Billabong Pro Teahupo’o event gives birth to a new champion each and every year. The past champions of the listed WSL competition are located below.

16. Billabong Pro Tahiti. (2013). ASP World Tour – The Association of Surfing Professionals.

17. Steve Robertson and Kim Kempton. Celebrating perfect 10’s at Billabong Pro Teahupoo. (2010). http://www.surfersvillage.com/surfing-news/48143#.Ucz9vuDraFI

18. Billabong Pro Teahupoo. (2012). http://www.redbull.com/cs/Satellite/en_INT/Event/Billabong-Pro-Teahupoo-021242894680885

References

External links
Official website
ASP website for the 2014 Billabong Pro Tahiti

 
World Surf League
Surfing competitions in French Polynesia
Recurring sporting events established in 1999
Sport in Tahiti